The Hondo River is a river of Comerío municipality, Puerto Rico.

See also

 Río Hondo Bridge: NRHP listing in Comerío, Puerto Rico
 List of rivers of Puerto Rico

References

External links
 USGS Hydrologic Unit Map – Caribbean Region (1974)
Rios de Puerto Rico

Rivers of Puerto Rico
Comerío, Puerto Rico